Michaëlla Krajicek and Maria Sanchez were the defending champions, but both players chose not to participate.

An-Sophie Mestach and Laura Robson won the title, defeating Sophie Chang and Alexandra Mueller in the final, 7–6(9–7), 7–6(7–2).

Seeds

Draw

References
Main Draw

Red Rock Pro Open - Doubles
2017 Red Rock Pro Open